Harry Vernon Quick (born 28 June 1941, Melbourne), is an Australian politician. He was a member of the Australian House of Representatives from 1993 until 2007, representing the electorate of Franklin. He sat as an Australian Labor Party representative from 1993 to 2007, when he was expelled from the party for failing to pay his membership dues. An outspoken maverick MP, he did not contest the 2007 federal election.

He first entered politics in 1993 after winning the southern Tasmanian seat of Franklin in the House of Representatives. On the night of the 1993 federal election, Quick was the first member to become elected (mainly due to the daylight saving time difference), reclaiming Franklin for Labor, for the first time in 17 years. During the time he has been member for Franklin the one-time Liberal stronghold has become a reasonably safe Labor seat. Even in the 2004 federal election where all Tasmanian Labor members lost support, Quick's decline was the smallest.

He was a teacher, education officer and electorate officer before entering politics. He worked for Senator Michael Tate prior to being elected to the House.

He also protested against the 2003 Iraq war in which Australian troops took part. He once took a Tasmanian apple into the Federal parliament in protest against legalising the import of New Zealand apples which have been banned in Australia for 80 years because of bio-security risk reasons, notably the Fireblight disease. He opposed the 2005 Walker Corporation planned development at Ralphs Bay, Lauderdale near Hobart that the State Labor Government had hoped for. He has always believed that politicians should take a "hands on" role in the community. Quick was an Opposition Whip 2001–04.

On 12 August 2005, Quick announced that he would not contest his seat at the next federal election, blaming what he called the party's left-right factional disputes and lack of a strong leader as the reasons for his retirement. Quick caused controversy during the 2006 state election by endorsing not only fellow Labor candidates in the state equivalent of his seat, but also a Tasmanian Greens member, Nick McKim.

Quick was expelled from the ALP on 20 August 2007 for failing to pay his membership fees. He sat as an Independent member until his retirement.

In February 2009, Quick was reported to be seeking preselection for the Tasmanian Legislative Council division of Derwent as a representative of the Tasmanian Greens. He had joined the Greens in July 2008. Five days after announcing his intention to contest the seat held by Treasurer Michael Aird, Quick abruptly changed his mind, citing a desire to spend more time with his family.

References

External links
Personal website

1941 births
Living people
Australian Labor Party members of the Parliament of Australia
Independent members of the Parliament of Australia
Members of the Australian House of Representatives for Franklin
Members of the Australian House of Representatives
21st-century Australian politicians
20th-century Australian politicians